Cheer Up, Mr. Kim! is a 2012-2013 South Korean television series that aired on KBS1 from November 5, 2012 to April 26, 2013 on Mondays to Fridays at 20:25 for 124 episodes. It starred Kim Dong-wan in the title role of Mr. Kim, a male housekeeper who becomes the guardian of four children.

Plot
Kim Tae-pyung is the guardian of three (later, four) children, none of which are his own. Abandoned himself as a child, Tae-pyung took on the role of parent at the age of seventeen when his newborn niece was orphaned, unwilling to see her sent to an orphanage. Since then, he has taken on responsibility for three other children, the children of friends unable to care for them. Shouldering such responsibility at a young age, Tae-pyung was unable to complete his education and makes a living being a domestic cleaner and housekeeper, providing for his charges through hard work and scrimping and saving. Although his prospects of finding love are repeatedly dashed by those unwilling to take on his children, Tae-pyung continues to hope of finding someone who will love him for who he is and appreciate a man doing his duty by his family.

Cast

Main characters
Kim Dong-wan as Kim Tae-pyung
Male housekeeper, guardian of four children. He is depicted as a hardworking and dedicated father figure to his children. His keen optimism, generosity and his willingness to go to great lengths to help others impacts a lot of people in his life.

Choi Jung-yoon as Chun Ji-young
School nurse, has known Tae-pyung since they were teenagers and is the daughter of his landlord. She is a divorcee and has had a crush to Tae-pyung for a long time.

Wang Ji-hye as Lee Woo-kyung
Schoolteacher, daughter of a chaebol household which employs Tae-pyung as a housekeeper. Dedicated to a fault, her students are her primary concern. Woo-kyung is also independent and headstrong.

Yang Jin-woo as Baek Gun-wook
Illegitimate son of a chaebol family, Woo-kyung's friend since childhood. He returned to Korea after studying in the United States to help run his father's company. Selfish and determined, he prefers things to go his way.

Supporting characters
The Kim "children"
Seo Ji-hee as Kim Hee-rae
Daughter of Tae-pyung's deceased elder brother, and the only one who is Tae-pyung's biological relative. She is strong-willed, bluntly honest and stubborn, mostly out of concern for her uncle.

Roh Jeong-eui as Nam Song-ah
Daughter of Tae-pyung's friends who are laying low to avoid creditors. She is the most affectionate towards Tae-pyung. She has asthma and often wears a mask outdoors.

Yeon Joon-seok as Ri Chul-ryong
Teenage defector from North Korea with no family in the South. He had spent most of his adolescence looking for his only brother, until he settles to enroll in college. Despite being diligent and obedient, he suffers from low self-confidence due to the discrimination he faces as a North Korean.

Oh Jae-moo as Ko Joo-sung
Teenager made homeless by a father absconding from creditors, and the most recent member to join the Kim household. He is spoiled and rude, yet emotionally fragile and has a kinder side. He is also classmates with Hee-rae, whom he often quarrels with.

Chun household
Baek Il-seob as Chun Kyung-sool
Ji-young's father and Tae-pyung's benefactor and landlord, who offered the first floor of his house to Tae-pyung's family. Tae-pyung considers him a mentor and frequently seeks him out for advice.

Lee Doo-il as Chun Myung-kwan
Kyung-sool's son, Ji-young's elder brother.

Jin Kyung as Jo Jae-nam
Myung-kwan's wife, who is often skeptical about Tae-pyung. A shallow, gossipy housewife, she values wealth and social position above all, and constantly grooms her daughter to become a suitable wife for a notable family.

Kim Soo-yeon as Chun Joo-hee
Daughter of Myung-kwan and Jae-nam, who is pressured by her parents to become someone she doesn't want to be. She shares her room with her aunt, Ji-young.

Lee household
Choi Il-hwa as Lee Sang-gook
Father of Woo-kyung, who is antagonistic towards Tae-pyung as he believes housekeeping is not a desirable job for a man.

Sa Mi-ja as Oh Ssang-shim
Grand-aunt of Woo-kyung, who did the housekeeping before Tae-pyung was hired. She is kinder and more reasonable than her younger sister.

Jung Jae-soon as Oh Ssang-ji
Grandmother of Woo-kyung. Demanding and hot-tempered, she often favors Ho-kyung over Woo-kyong.

Kang Sung-min as Lee Ho-kyung
Older brother of Woo-kyung, who uses a wheelchair after an accident. He and Woo-kyung care deeply about each other's welfare. He is agoraphobic and spends most of his time blogging. He and Tae-pyung become friends and share a great bond.

Baek household
Lee Jung-gil as Baek Jae-sang
Father of Gun-wook.

Kim Hyeseon as Hong Hae-sook
Mother of Gun-wook.

Extended cast
Song Seo-yeon as Joo Yeon-ji
Kim Deok-hyeon as Director Kim
Yoo Yeon-ji as Jang Hye-ryung
Lee Jong-gu as Moon Gyo-soo
Jo Jung-rae as Byung-jin

Ratings

Key
-lowest rated episode
-highest rated episode

Awards and nominations

References

External links
  
 
 

Korean Broadcasting System television dramas
2012 South Korean television series debuts
2013 South Korean television series endings
Korean-language television shows
South Korean romance television series